Believe is the second album from producer, songwriter, DJ, and remixer Morgan Page, released on February 23, 2010.

The first single from Believe was "Fight for You", featuring guest vocals from Elisabeth Maurus (a.k.a. Lissie). "Fight for You" has been featured in live sets by artists such as Tiesto, Armin van Buuren, Above & Beyond, Dave Dresden, and Hernan Cattaneo. The single was #6 on AOL's Top 10 Dance Songs of 2009, and was also featured as a free track on the iPod Touch/iPhone app Tap Tap Revenge 2.

Page's second single, a cover of Pete Yorn's "Strange Condition", also features vocals from Elisabeth Maurus.

Critical reception 

Believe received generally positive reviews. David Jeffries from Allmusic gave the album 3.5 out of 5 stars, writing: "While the melancholic mood throughout the record might wear on some, Believe is a well-crafted mood piece for the prog house faithful, featuring all the murky atmosphere the producer’s underserved fans crave."

About.com writer Scott Nelson gave the album 5 out of 5 stars, saying Morgan had "really figured out his place in dance music as the arrangement and production are pretty much perfect". Nelson singled out Maurus' voice as a better compliment for Page's music than the other singers featured on the album.

Sarah Benzuly of Mix wrote that "Believe is infused with melodic grooves, syncopated rhythms and textures that ebb and flow from one track to the next."

Track listing

References 

2010 albums
Morgan Page albums